Don Bradman (1908–2001) was an Australian cricketer.

Bradman may also refer to:
 HMS Bradman, a Royal Navy anti-submarine trawler sunk in 1940, named for Don Bradman
 2472 Bradman, an asteroid, named for Don Bradman
 Bradman Oval, a cricket grounds in Bowral, New South Wales, Australia
 Bradman (crossword compiler), one of the pseudonyms of Don Manley

People with the name
 Greta Bradman, Australian operatic soprano, granddaughter of Don Bradman
 Sam Bradman (born 1990), American lacrosse player
 Tony Bradman  (born 1954), English children's author
 Bradman Best (born 2001), Australian rugby league player
 Bradman Weerakoon (born 1930), retired senior bureaucrat of the Sri Lankan government, named for Don Bradman

See also

Don Bradman (disambiguation)